Akkaynar (Aqqainar), formerly Prudki, is an agricultural village in Almaty Region of south-eastern Kazakhstan. It is located approximately 40 kilometres west of Kaskelen, not far from the border with Kyrgyzstan. There are petroglyphs in the lower parts of the namesake river valley, discovered in 2001 C.E. by J. Abubekerov and R. Sala.

External links
Tageo.com

Populated places in Almaty Region